Flyme may refer to:

Flyme (Villa Air), Maldivian airline launched in 2011
FlyMe, former low-cost airline based in Gothenburg, Sweden
Flyme OS, firmware for smartphones by Meizu, based on Android

See also
FlyMex, charter airline based in Mexico
Fly Me, United States–Filipino sexploitation film
Lyme (disambiguation)